Ellen C. Jaffee (born May 20, 1944) is an American politician who served as a Democratic member of the New York State Assembly, representing the 97th Assembly District in Rockland County.

A native of Brooklyn, Jaffee earned her B.A. in Education from Brooklyn College and her M.S. in Special Education from Fordham University. She was previously a teacher at Pomona Middle School before becoming an elected official of the Rockland County Legislature in 1998.

Jaffee was first elected to the State Assembly in 2006 for a two-year term (2007–2009). She ran uncontested in the 2008 general election and won the 2010 general election with 61 percent of the vote.

Jaffee has lived in Suffern since 1978, where she and her late husband, Steve, raised two children, Marc and Allison. Steve Jaffee, who was also the Chairman of the Suffern Democratic Committee, died on January 19, 2016.

Jaffee was defeated in the 2020 election by Republican Mike Lawler.

References

External links
New York State Assembly Member Website
Official Website of Ellen Jaffee
Assembly District 95, New York State

1944 births
Living people
Members of the New York State Assembly
People from Suffern, New York
Women state legislators in New York (state)
Politicians from Rockland County, New York
Jewish American state legislators in New York (state)
Brooklyn College alumni
Fordham University alumni
21st-century American politicians
21st-century American women politicians
21st-century American Jews